Katya Danielle Cengel (born 1976) is an American author and journalist.

Early life 
Cengel was born in Oakland, California. In 1998, she earned a bachelor's degree in Literature Writing from UC San Diego.

Career 
In 1998, Cengel was working as a features writer for The Baltic Times newspaper in Riga, Latvia. Later, Cengel was a general assignment reporter for the Kyiv Post. She also reported regularly for the San Francisco Chronicle and BBC World Service. Cengel described her Central European life and work in her 2019 book From Chernobyl With Love: Reporting from the Ruins of the Soviet Union for which she won the IPPY and Foreword INDIE awards.

Returning to the United States, Cengel joined the Louisville Courier-Journal as a general assignment features reporter. Her series on the families of the Lost Boys of Sudan received second place feature writing from the Society of Professional Journalists 2005 Green Eyeshade Award.

Cengel teaches journalism at Cal Poly San Luis Obispo and UC Berkeley Extension.

Bibliography
Bluegrass Baseball: A Year In The Minor League Life (2012) Lincoln, Nebraska: University of Nebraska Press. Review
Exiled: From the Killing Fields of Cambodia to California and Back (2018) Lincoln, Nebraska: Potomac Books, An imprint of the University of Nebraska Press.  Review
From Chernobyl With Love: Reporting from the Ruins of the Soviet Union (2019). Lincoln, Nebraska: Potomac Books, An imprint of the University of Nebraska Press.      Review

References 

1976 births
Living people
American women journalists
American women non-fiction writers
20th-century American journalists
20th-century American women writers
21st-century American journalists
21st-century American non-fiction writers
21st-century American women writers
Journalists from Oakland, California
University of California, San Diego alumni
California Polytechnic State University faculty
UC Berkeley Extension faculty